Brandon Ayerdis (born 11 September 1994) is a Nicaraguan professional footballer who plays as a striker for Liga Primera club Real Estelí and the Nicaragua national team.

References

1994 births
Living people
People from Carazo Department
Nicaraguan men's footballers
Association football forwards
Association football wingers
Juventus Managua players
Real Estelí F.C. players
Nicaraguan Primera División players
Nicaragua international footballers